Zangla is a village in Zanskar tehsil of Kargil district, in the Indian union territory of Ladakh. It is located 262 km from Kargil city, the district headquarter, 32 km from Padum, the capital of Zanskar, and presently is the headquarters of Zanskar. An ancient ruined fort, known as Zangla Fort is located on a hilltop one km outside the village, believed to be 11th-century.

The Buddhist ruined fort contains some impressive paintings.

Geography

Demographics
According to the 2011 census of India, Zangla had 182 households. The literacy rate of Zangla village is 59.81%. In Zangla, Male literacy stands at 75.06% while the female literacy rate was 45.27%.

Transport

Road
Zangla is connected by road to other places in Ladakh and India by the NH 301.

Rail
The nearest railway stations to Zangla are Sopore railway station and Srinagar railway station located at a distance of 480 kilometres and 487 kilometres. The nearest major railway stations are Jammu Tawi railway station and Udhampur railway station, located 725 and 658 kilometres from Zangla.

Air
The nearest airport is located in Kargil at a distance of 269 kilometres but it is currently non-operational. The next nearest major airport is Leh Airport located at a distance of 476 kilometres.

See also
Ladakh
Kargil
Zanskar

References

Villages in Zanskar tehsil